Colonus is a genus of spiders in the jumping spider family, Salticidae. Colonus species are endemic to North and South America, ranging from New York to Argentina. All members of the genus have two pairs of bulbous spines on the ventral side of the first tibiae. The function of these spines is unknown. Colonus was declared a junior synonym of Thiodina by Eugène Simon in 1903, but this was reversed by Bustamante, Maddison, and Ruiz in 2015.

Species
, the World Spider Catalog accepted 14 species of Colonus:

 Colonus branicki (Taczanowski, 1871) – Venezuela, Guyana, French Guiana
 Colonus candidus (Mello-Leitão, 1922) – Brazil
 Colonus germaini (Simon, 1900) – Brazil, Argentina
 Colonus hesperus (Richman & Vetter, 2004) – United States, Mexico
 Colonus melanogaster (Mello-Leitão, 1917) – Brazil
 Colonus pallidus (C. L. Koch, 1846) – Colombia to Argentina
 Colonus pseustes (Chamberlin & Ivie, 1936) – Panama, French Guiana
 Colonus puerperus (Hentz, 1846) – eastern United States
 Colonus punctulatus (Mello-Leitão, 1917) – Brazil
 Colonus rishwani (Makhan, 2006) – Suriname
 Colonus robustus (Mello-Leitão, 1945) – Argentina
 Colonus sylvanus (Hentz, 1846) – United States to Panama
 Colonus vaccula (Simon, 1900) – Peru, Brazil
 Colonus vellardi (Soares & Camargo, 1948) – Brazil

References

External links

Videos
 David Edwin Hill: Male Colonus sylvanus feeding on Oxyopes salticus — Video 220 Mb
 David Edwin Hill: Movement of the articulated pretarsal claws and footpads by a walking jumping spider, Colonus sylvanus — Video 218 Mb
 David Edwin Hill: Colonus sylvanus feeding on Leucauge venusta — Video
 David Edwin Hill: Colonus sylvanus walking and turning slowly — Video

Pictures
 Picture of ''C. puerperus
 Pictures of C. sylvanus

Salticidae genera
Spiders of North America
Spiders of South America
Salticidae